The 2023 Bredene Koksijde Classic was the 20th edition of the Bredene Koksijde Classic road cycling one day race, which was held on 17 March 2023, starting and finishing in the titular towns of Bredene and Koksijde, respectively.

Teams 
Eight UCI WorldTeams, eleven UCI ProTeams, and four UCI Continental teams made up the twenty-three teams that participated in the race.

UCI WorldTeams

 
 
 
 
 
 
 
 

UCI ProTeams

 
 
 
 
 
 
 
 
 
 
 

UCI Continental Teams

Result

References

External links 
 

2023
Bredene Koksijde Classic
Bredene Koksijde Classic
Bredene Koksijde Classic